Derby is an unincorporated community located in south-central Frio County in the U.S. state of Texas. The town is located on the Missouri Pacific Railroad, at the intersection of I-35 and FM 1583.

History
The town was formed in 1879 by John Bennett. In 1882, a post office was established under the name of Lenore, with the town later being renamed to Derby, after Bennett's hometown of Derby, England. Derby was renamed to Otley, after the village of Otley, Suffolk. By 1906, the town was renamed to Derby. In 2009, the population of Derby was estimated to be 50.

Education
The town is served by the Pearsall Independent School District.

References

Unincorporated communities in Frio County, Texas
Unincorporated communities in Texas